An Amerigame, short for American-style board game, is a loose category of tabletop game that generally features a prominent theme, encourages direct conflict between players, and has a significant degree of luck. It is distinguished from a Eurogame, or German-style board game, in that American-style games often have longer playtimes and mechanics designed to suit the theme. Not all games from the United States fall under this category. Many of the famous games were invented outside USA. Party games like Codenames, cooperative board games like Pandemic, and family-friendly board games with simpler or abstract rules like Scrabble and Chess are usually excluded.

History 

The oldest known games in the American-style are Pachisi and Snakes and Ladders from India. Early board game producers in the second half of the eighteenth century were mapmakers. The global popularization of Board Games, with special themes and branding, coincided with the formation of the global dominance of the British Empire. John Wallis was an English board game publisher, bookseller, map/chart seller, print seller, music seller, and cartographer. With his sons John Wallis Jr. and Edward Wallis, he was one of the most prolific publishers of board games of the late 18th and early 19th centuries. John Betts’ A Tour of the British Colonies and Foreign Possessions and William Spooner's A Voyage of Discovery  were popular in the British empire.

In 1903, American anti-monopolist Lizzie Magie created a game which she hoped would explain the single tax theory of Henry George. It was intended as an educational tool to illustrate the negative aspects of concentrating land in private monopolies. She took out a patent in 1904. Her game, The Landlord's Game, was self-published, beginning in 1906. Lizzie created two sets of rules: an anti-monopolist set in which all were rewarded when wealth was created, and a monopolist set in which the goal was to create monopolies and crush opponents. According to an advertisement placed in The Christian Science Monitor, Charles Todd of Philadelphia recalled the day in 1932 when his childhood friend, Esther Jones, and her husband Charles Darrow came to their house for dinner. After the meal, the Todds introduced Darrow to The Landlord's Game, which they then played several times. The game was entirely new to Darrow, and he asked the Todds for a written set of the rules. After that night, Darrow went on to utilize this and distribute the game himself as Monopoly. After the game's excellent sales during the Christmas season of 1934, Parker Brothers bought the game's copyrights from Darrow. When the company learned Darrow was not the sole inventor of the game, it bought the rights to Magie's patent for just $500.

In 1938, the American toy and game company Transogram introduced a mass market board game version of Pachisi called Game of India, later marketed as Pa-Chiz-Si: The Game of India. This game was later published by Parker Brothers and Winning Moves as Parcheesi. Snakes and Ladders as it was known in England, was introduced in the United States as Chutes and Ladders (an "improved new version of England's famous indoor sport") by game pioneer Milton Bradley in 1943.

The idea for Diplomacy arose from Allan B. Calhamer's study at Harvard of nineteenth-century European history under Sidney B. Fay inter alia, and from his study of political geography. The rough form of Diplomacy was created in 1954, and its details were developed through playtesting until the 1958 map and rules revisions. Calhamer paid for a 500-game print run of that version in 1959 after rejection by major companies. It has been published since then by Games Research (in 1961, then a 1971 edition with a revised rulebook), Avalon Hill (in 1976), by Hasbro's Avalon Hill division (in 1999), and now by Wizards of the Coast (in 2008) in the US, and licensed to other boardgame publishers for versions sold in other countries. Among these are Parker Brothers, Waddingtons Games, Gibsons Games, Asmodée Editions.

Risk was invented by French film director Albert Lamorisse and originally released in 1957 as La Conquête du Monde (The Conquest of the World) in France. It was bought by Parker Brothers and released in 1959 with some modifications to the rules as Risk: The Continental Game, then as Risk: The Game of Global Domination.

Newer Amerigames continue to be created. War of the Ring is a Lord of the Rings themed board game first produced by Nexus Editrice and currently published by Ares Games in 2004.

Characteristics

Direct conflict between players 

Amerigames often encourage players to attack one another directly, to progress in the game.

In some cooperative games, one or two players take on the role of traitor. The traitors typically win by triggering a failure condition for the other players. In Battlestar Galactica: The Board Game, players who receive a “You Are a Cylon” card when loyalty cards are handed out work in secret to undermine the progress of the human players.

High randomness 
Amerigame designs tend to emphasize luck and random elements. Uncertainty is a tool for heightening the drama. The random elements of the game will be resource or terrain distribution in the initial setup, random order of a set of events or objectives, etc. Randomizers like dice-rolling or card-draws are commonly used.

Focus on the theme 

Amerigames share a core focus on the theme of the game's scenario and dramatic game-play. Themes of combat and direct competition, derived from the setting or the objective, are common. Game titles tend to be dramatic. Game art and pieces are usually customized to invoke the same feel as the theme and the setting.

Player elimination 
Another prominent characteristic of these games is player elimination—eliminating players before the end of the game where a player may be defeated like Diplomacy and Risk or where a player may go bankrupt and thus be eliminated like Monopoly. Most of these games are designed to eliminate players from the game as quickly as possible.

Related to player elimination is that Amerigame scoring systems are often designed with transparent scoring, so that players can target the player who appears to be in a leading position. A second-order consequence is that Amerigames tend to have few paths to victory, and it is often obvious to other players which strategic path a player is pursuing.

Game mechanics 
A wide variety of familiar mechanics like rolling dice and moving, capture, or trick taking were introduced in American style games. In games such as Risk and Monopoly, a close game can extend indefinitely. Game mechanics are restricted by the theme.

See also 
 Eurogame
 Cooperative board game – board games in which players work together to achieve a common goal
 BoardGameGeek – online forum for board gaming hobbyists
 List of game designers

References 

Bibliography

Board games
American culture